Simon Power (born 13 May 1998) is an Irish professional footballer who plays as a midfielder for Shamrock Rovers. He represented Ireland at youth level.

Club career

Early career
Born in Greystones, Power started his career as a youth player for Greystones United and later played youth football for St Josephs Boys, Cabinteely before making his senior debut for Cabinteely in August 2015 as a substitute against Finn Harps. He later signed for UCD, where he made 13 league appearances and scored one goal.

Norwich City
In January 2018, Power joined Norwich City on an 18-month contract following a trial period with the club. Power agreed a two-year extension to his deal in January 2019, six months before it was due to expire, and also joined Eerste Divisie side Dordrecht on loan until the end of the season. He made 10 appearances for Dordrecht and scored one goal.

On 4 July 2019, Power joined newly promoted Scottish Premiership side Ross County on loan. On 13 July 2019 he made his debut for the club against Montrose in the Scottish League Cup. However, he was recalled by Norwich in January 2020 after making just 4 senior appearances. Later that month, he joined National League North side Kings Lynn Town on loan until the end of the season. He made six appearances and scored twice as Kings Lynn were promoted to the National League.

In August 2020, he returned to Kings Lynn Town on a season-long loan. His loan was cut short in January 2021 in order to join Harrogate Town on a permanent deal, having made 13 appearances and scored two goals for the Linnets in all competitions.

Harrogate Town
On 18 January 2021, Power joined League Two side Harrogate Town on a free transfer. He made his first league appearance for the Sulphurites in the No. 30 shirt on 22 January 2021 in a 2-2 away draw at Salford, and scored his first league goal on 6 February in a 3-1 win at Crawley Town, a game which was also notable for being the solitary League Two appearance by Mark Wright for Crawley.

International career
Power has represented Ireland at under-18, under-19 and under-21 levels.

Personal life
His father Rory played for Greystones United and Dalkey United and his brother Joe is also a footballer. His older sister Sophie has represented Ireland at tag rugby.

Career statistics

References

1998 births
Living people
Republic of Ireland association footballers
Republic of Ireland expatriate association footballers
Association football midfielders
Cabinteely F.C. players
University College Dublin A.F.C. players
Norwich City F.C. players
FC Dordrecht players
Republic of Ireland youth international footballers
Eerste Divisie players
Expatriate footballers in the Netherlands
Ross County F.C. players
Scottish Professional Football League players
King's Lynn Town F.C. players
Harrogate Town A.F.C. players
Shamrock Rovers F.C. players
English Football League players